The Northern Sun Intercollegiate Conference men's basketball tournament is the annual men's conference basketball championship tournament for the Northern Sun Intercollegiate Conference. The tournament has been held annually since 2000. It is a single-elimination tournament and seeding is based on regular season records.

The winner, declared conference champion, receives the conference's automatic bid to the NCAA Men's Division II Basketball Championship.

Tournament format
Between its establishment in 2000 and 2012, the tournament featured only the top 8 teams from the conference, with all eight teams active from the quarterfinal round. 

After 2013, however, the tournament expanded to 16 teams, with teams seeded based on their performance in either the North or South Division of the Northern Sun. The first round, which features all sixteen teams, pairs the top-seeded teams from the North and South Divisions against the eighth-seeded team from the opposite division. In turn, the second-seeded team from each of these teams' brackets comes from the opposite division (i.e. the top-seeded team from the North would ideally oppose the second-seeded team from the South and vice versa for the other division's top team). This pattern continues for the third- and fourth-seeded teams. 

In all instances of the tournament, the semifinal and final rounds have been played at a pre-determined venue, which has also hosted the quarterfinal round since 2012. From 2000 to 2011, these sites were the on-campus gymnasium of Northern Sun teams. Since 2012, however, these have been neutral-site arenas not home to any Northern Sun programs.

Results

Championship appearances by school

 Concordia–St. Paul, Mary (ND), Minnesota–Crookston, Minot State, and  Sioux Falls have yet to reach the NSIC tournament final.
 Minnesota–Morris never reached the finals of the NSIC tournament before departing the conference.

References

NCAA Division II men's basketball conference tournaments
Tournament
Recurring sporting events established in 2000